Willis Verl Young (October 27, 1911 – April 3, 1981), frequently misnamed as Willie Young, was an American professional basketball player. He played in the National Basketball League in just two games for the Whiting Ciesar All-Americans during the 1937–38 season (both being playoff appearances).

References

1911 births
1981 deaths
Amateur Athletic Union men's basketball players
American men's basketball players
Basketball players from Indiana
Centers (basketball)
People from Delphi, Indiana
Whiting Ciesar All-Americans players